Bubur cha cha, also spelled as bubur cha-cha or dubo jiajie, is a Betawi and Malay dessert and breakfast dish in Indonesian cuisine, Malaysian cuisine, Singaporean cuisine and Phuket cuisine (Thailand) prepared using pearled sago, sweet potatoes, yams, bananas, coconut milk, pandan leaves, sugar and salt. Grated coconut, coconut cream and water can be used as additional ingredients. The ingredients are cooked in coconut milk, and the dish can be served hot or cold. Bubur cha cha is also sold as a street food in many parts of Southeast Asia.

See also

 Indonesian cuisine
 Malaysian cuisine
 Phuket cuisine
 Singaporean cuisine
 Thai cuisine
 List of desserts
 Betawi cuisine
 Malay cuisine
 Peranakan cuisine
 Bubur kacang hijau
 Bubur ketan hitam
 Bubur pedas
 Bubur sumsum

Notes

References

External links
 Bubur cha cha. Rotinrice.com.

Singaporean cuisine
Indonesian desserts
Malaysian desserts
Betawi cuisine
Malay cuisine
Peranakan cuisine